The Long Summer of George Adams is a 1982 American made-for-television drama film starring James Garner and Joan Hackett. The film was directed by Stuart Margolin, and was based upon a novel by Weldon Hill.

Plot
Set in 1952, George Adams is a man at the end of his rope. He is a steam engine fitter working for the railroad at a way station in his hometown of Cushing, Oklahoma. However, he finds himself working at a time when the railroads are converting from steam engines to diesel-electrics. Just like the engines he works on, he knows his time of usefulness for the railroad is running out. To make ends meet, he has taken a second job as the town's night watchman. This has created George's greatest frustration. The schedule he is on has him sleeping each night in the attic, waking at mid-day to his wife, Norma, making lunch for his two boys. Between the two jobs he works and his wife's schedule with the family, there is almost no time for George to be alone with Norma. This strikes him as a particularly cruel blow, and in frustration he questions her interest. She assures him she would welcome a visit, but finds the schedule is working against them. In the back of his mind George keeps believing a man could be happy if he could have his wife and family in his own home on his own piece of land.

George struggles to hold his home and family together. He is good friends with Ernie, a Korean War veteran who is hopelessly in love with Norma's younger sister, who lives with the family. A number of events ensue, including a playful bout of fisticuffs in the ring with a local chicken farmer. George slips just as he is being punched, ending the fight with an apparent knock down. This is a point of great embarrassment and disappointment for his two boys. When his wife leaves town with the family to visit relatives, he confides to Ernie this is going to be a long summer. With his wife away George succumbs to a brief affair with his neighbor. This is not as well a kept secret as George might hope, though his wife never finds out. George and Ernie end up stopping a bank robbery. Finally George receives the letter he had been dreading from the railroad company, a transfer order to Gunther, a town he and his wife have no interest in moving to. George finally puts his foot down, deciding to quit the railroad and return to his father's nearby homestead, to build his family a home and return to a life of farming in Cushing, Oklahoma.

Cast
 James Garner as George Adams
 Joan Hackett as Norma Adams
 Alex Harvey as Ernie
 Juanin Clay as Ann Sharp
 Anjanette Comer as Venida
 David Graf as Olin Summers
 Helena Humann as Vi
 Jessie Lee Fulton as Ada May
 Bill Thurman as Floyd
 Marla Maddoux as Mandy
 Bobby Fite as Bill Adams
 Blake Tannery as Leroy Adams
 Joe Satterwhite as Ben Adams
 Darryl Royal as Al Green
 Jack Garner as Woody Pierce

Production
The story of an average man in a small Oklahoma town had been of interest to Garner for some time prior to the shooting of the picture. Garner was a native of Oklahoma, and had held onto the script for 10 years. A number of Garner's crew from The Rockford Files participated in the making of the movie, including Stuart Margolin, who directed the project.

The movie was well received. People Magazine noted: "Garner’s wry style and an excellent supporting cast make this TV movie worthwhile."

References
Citations

Bibliography
 Ryan, Stephen H. and Paul J. Ryan The Essential James Garner Lanham: Rowman & Littlefield, (2018).
 Strait, Raymond James Garner: a Biography New York, NY: St. Martin's Press, (1985).

External links
 
 
 

1982 television films
1982 films
1982 drama films
Films set in Oklahoma
Films shot in Texas
Warner Bros. films
Films with screenplays by John Gay (screenwriter)
American drama television films
Films directed by Stuart Margolin
1980s American films